Aliskiren/hydrochlorothiazide, sold under the brand name Tekturna HCT among others, is a fixed-dose combination medication for the treatment of hypertension (high blood pressure). It contains aliskiren, a renin inhibitor, and hydrochlorothiazide, a diuretic. It is taken by mouth.

The most common side effect is diarrhea.

Aliskiren/hydrochlorothiazide was approved for medical use in the United States in January 2008, and for use in the European Union in January 2009.

Medical uses 
Aliskiren/hydrochlorothiazide is indicated for the treatment of essential hypertension in adults.

References

External links
 

Combination drugs